Bogdan Aleksandrovich Aleshchenko (born 12 May 1994) is a former Russian football midfielder.

Club career
He made his debut in the Russian Football National League for FC Shinnik Yaroslavl on 23 November 2013 in a game against FC Mordovia Saransk.

References

External links
 
 
 

1994 births
Living people
People from Pryluky
Ukrainian emigrants to Russia
Russian footballers
Association football midfielders
FC Shinnik Yaroslavl players
FC Tambov players